David Smyth may refer to:

 David Smyth (footballer) (1914–?), Scottish footballer
 Dave Smyth, American soccer defender
 David Smyth (rugby union), rugby coach
 David J. Smyth (1872–1954), member of the Pennsylvania House of Representatives
 David A. Smyth,  British scholar in the field of Thai studies